
Isirere Lake  or  Iserere Lake is a lake in the Beni Department, Bolivia. At an elevation of 258 m, its surface area is 19.3 km².

Lakes of Beni Department